Calindoia or Kalindoia was an ancient Bottiaean city in Mygdonia (modern Thessaloniki regional unit, Kalamoto village). The name also comes down to us in the form Calindaea. The town also bore the names Alindoia and Tripoiai.

Kalindoia is first reported in the Athenian-Bottiaean alliance of 422 BCE and later in the Epidaurian list of Theorodokoi of 360/59 BCE. The name of Theodorokos was Pausanias, possibly the same as Pausanias, the pretender to the Macedonian throne in 368 and 360 BCE. It was refounded as a Macedonian city in the late 4th century BCE. A dedicatory inscription  to Apollo was found at Toumbes Kalamotou; it records a list of priests of Asclepius (archpriest Agathanor) who had fulfilled their duties from the time when King Alexander gave Kalindoia to Makedones.  Priests of Asclepius were frequently eponymous officials (archontes) in Macedon.

The site of Kalindoia is located near modern Kalamoto.

See also
List of ancient Macedonians in epigraphy#Kalindoia decree (c. 335 - 305 BC)

References

Epigraphical Database Epidaurian Theorodokoi-IG IV²,1 94-Decree of Kalindoia Meletemata 11 K31 SEG 36.626
Studies in the Ancient Greek Polis Page 114 by Mogens Herman Hansen, Kurt A. Raaflaub 
The Hellenistic Settlements in Europe, the Islands, and Asia Minor Page 94 by Getzel M. Cohen 

Geography of ancient Mygdonia
Populated places in ancient Macedonia
Cities in ancient Macedonia
Former populated places in Greece
Argead colonies in Macedonia
Members of the Delian League